Siegfried Mureșan (born 20 September 1981) is a Romanian economist and politician, vice-president of the European People's Party (EPP) since November 2019, vice-president of the European People's Party Group (EPP Group) in the European Parliament and member of the National Liberal Party (PNL). He was elected as Member of the European Parliament (MEP) from Romania in 2014 and 2019. Previously, he was a member of the People's Movement Party (PMP) between 2014 and 2018 and the Democratic Liberal Party (PDL) before 2014.

Education
Mureșan graduated from the Bucharest Academy of Economic Studies (ASE) in 2004. He also holds a master's degree in Economics and Management from Humboldt University of Berlin.

Early career
In 2006, Mureșan was part of the International Scholarship Programme of the German Parliament. Subsequently, he continued for three years as an Advisor to the Chair of the Committee on European Affairs of the German Parliament, Gunther Krichbaum, and afterwards he worked briefly in the European Parliament. In 2011, he joined the Headquarters of the European People’s Party (EPP) as Political Advisor for Economics and Social Policy. In January 2014, he was promoted to Senior Political Advisor. Afterwards, in January 2015, he was appointed Political Spokesperson of the EPP.

Political career

First term as Member of the European Parliament 

In March 2014, Mureșan joined the People's Movement Party (PMP), and took part in the European Parliament elections which were held on 25 May 2014. He was the second candidate on the list and was elected for a five-year term in the European Parliament. Later on, Mureșan was elected as vice-president of the Committee on Budgets, substitute member of the Committee on Economic and Monetary Affairs and member of the Delegation to the EU - Moldova Parliamentary Association Committee.

In July 2014, Mureșan was appointed President of the Youth of PMP. On 22 January 2015, the President of the European People’s Party (EPP), Joseph Daul, announced Mureșan as the newly appointed spokesperson of the EPP. On 7 May 2018 he joined the National Liberal Party (PNL), the largest member party of the EPP in Romania.

Rapporteur on redundancies from Câmpia Turzii 

The European Parliament approved Mureșan’s report on redundancies from Câmpia Turzii in September 2014, allocating EUR 3.57 million in European Globalisation Adjustment Fund that were needed in order to offer support to redundant workers from Mechel Steel Plant from Câmpia Turzii.

Support for Romania following 2014 floods 

In July 2015, the Parliament approved financial aid worth EUR 66.5 million in order to compensate the damage caused by the floods of 2014 in Romania, Italy and Bulgaria in response to a report coordinated by Mureșan.

EPP Group Negotiator for the 2017 EU Budget 

In 2016, Mureșan was appointed as main negotiator of the EPP Group for the 2017 EU Budget.

European Parliament Rapporteur for the 2018 EU Budget 

On 24 November 2016, the Committee on Budgets designated Mureșan as the European Parliament’s rapporteur for the EU Budget 2018, the first Romanian to take on this role.

As Chief Negotiator of the European Parliament for the EU Budget 2018, one of Mureșan’s main priorities for the negotiations was the increase of the budget allocations for the Eastern Neighbourhood countries, including the Republic of Moldova.

Representing the European Parliament 

Mureșan participated as a European Parliament representative at the 2016 World Bank-IMF annual meeting in Washington DC. He participated as an international observer in the Election Observation Mission of the European Parliament during the two rounds of the 2016 presidential election in Moldova.

EPP Group Rapporteur on the activity of the European Investment Bank and the European Central Bank 
During his first mandate as a member of the European Parliament, Siegfried Vasile Mureșan was also EPP Group rapporteur on the 2016 annual report on the financial activities of the European Investment Bank and EPP Group rapporteur on the report on the 2016 annual report of the European Central Bank.

Positions in the European Parliament on the rule of law in Romania 
Mureșan criticised the measures taken by the Romanian Government and Romanian Parliament in 2017 and 2018 to amend judicial legislation. He took part in protests against the Romanian Government organised between January 2017 and February 2018 in Bucharest. 

On 7 February 2018, during the debate of the European Parliament on "Threats to the Rule of Law Caused by the Judicial Reform in Romania" Mureșan emphasized his support for the protesters, saying “the reality in Romania is as follows: there is a major discrepancy between what people want and what the ruling coalition wants. People want justice and rule of law. They want European values, while the politicians from the Government want to weaken state institutions and put justice under their control.”

Second term as Member of the European Parliament
On 24 September 2018, Mureșan submitted to the National Liberal Party (PNL) his application file as candidate for a new mandate in the European Parliament. In his application file, he defined as his most important objectives for the upcoming parliamentary term the protection of Romania's interests throughout his activity in the Committee on Budgets of the European Parliament and the securing of the highest level of financial allocations for Romania. At the same time, he emphasized his commitment to obtain sufficient financial allocations from the EU Budget for "Erasmus” scholarships and researchers, as well as for farmers and cohesion policy.

Mureșan also outlined his plans to actively take part in the debates on the future of the Eurozone, so that the decisions adopted at EU level would not affect in a negative way the economy of Romania. Moreover, he clearly committed to protecting the rights and interests of the non-euro area Member States that have expressed their will to join the euro.

On 14 March 2019, the enlarged presidency of the National Liberal Party (PNL) approved the list of candidates for the European Parliament elections taking place on 26 May 2019. Mureşan was placed on the third position on the National Liberal Party candidates’ list.

On 27 March 2019, the National Liberal Party officially submitted to the Central Electoral Bureau the list of candidates and the necessary support signatures for the European Parliament elections, taking place on 26 May 2019. Mureșan thus became an official candidate for a new mandate in the European Parliament. The National Liberal Party won the elections of 26 May 2019 by obtaining 27% of the votes cast and Mureșan was elected for a new term in the European Parliament.

Vice-Chair of the EPP Group in the European Parliament 
Shortly after the elections, on 5 June 2019, Mureșan became Vice-Chair of the EPP Group in the European Parliament (the largest political group of the European Parliament). He was elected by 141 out of 158 votes cast. On 19 September 2019, the EPP Group in the European Parliament decided that Siegfried Mureșan, in his capacity as Vice-Chair of the EPP Group, will coordinate the Group’s activity in the areas relating to the EU budget, regional development, agriculture and budgetary control. He was re-elected as Vice-Chair of the EPP Group in October 2021, with the highest number of votes among the 10 Vice-Chairs elected.

Vice-President of the European People's Party 
On 12 November 2019 Mureșan was elected as Vice-President of the European People's Party (EPP). One of the main priorities during his mandate will be to advocate for EPP to be the European party that contributes decisively to strengthening Romania’s position as part of the European Union.

On 1 June 2022, he was re-elected as Vice-President during the EPP Congress in Rotterdam.

Rapporteur on the financing of the European Green Deal 
In January 2020, Mureșan was appointed as the European Parliament’s rapporteur on the financing of the European Green Deal. The report on the Sustainable Europe Investment Plan (the Green Deal), coordinated by Mureşan, was adopted in October 2020 in a joint session of the European Parliament’s Budgets and Economic and Monetary Affairs Committees. In the Report, the European Parliament requests an adequate financing of the Green Deal to help reduce the gaps between Eastern and Western European countries in the transition to an emission-neutral economy.

Since 2021, he has been part of the Parliament's delegation to the Conference on the Future of Europe.

Co-Rapporteur for the European Recovery and Resilience Facility (RRF)
In July 2020, Mureșan was elected co-rapporteur of the European Parliament for the European Recovery and Resilience Facility (RRF), a tool designed to help EU member states finance their national economic recovery plans in the context of the COVID-19 pandemic. In February 2021, following a report coordinated by  Mureșan as co-rapporteur, the European Parliament adopted the RRF legislation. According to the report, Member States would receive EUR 672.5 billion to finance their recovery plans. The investments and reforms financed by RRF must be started by December 31, 2023. Romania would benefit from approximately EUR 30 billion from the Facility. 

In December 2021, Mureșan was also appointed co-rapporteur of the European Parliament for the report on the implementation of the European Recovery and Resilience Facility.

The first Report on the implementation of the European Recovery and Resilience Facility was adopted in the European Parliament Plenary on 23 June 2022. The Report recommends the use of unspent funds from the Recovery and Resilience Facility, about  EUR 200 billion, for investments in cross-border energy projects.

Rapporteur on the adoption by Croatia of the euro on 1 January 2023 

Siegfried Mureșan was the rapporteur on the opinion of the European Parliament for the accession of Croatia to the Euro area. Mureșan's report, which supports Croatia's accession to the Eurozone, was adopted by the European Parliament's plenary in July 2022.

EU - Republic of Moldova relations 

In addition to his committee work, Mureșan has been chairing the European Parliament’s delegation to the EU-Moldova Parliamentary Association Committee since 26 September 2019.

Awards and distinctions 
Siegfried Mureșan was awarded the Order of Honour of the Republic of Moldova by President Maia Sandu in December 2021, "as a sign of appreciation for supporting the goal of European integration and efforts to strengthen democratic processes in the Republic of Moldova".

Personal life 
In 2016, Mureșan married Cătălina Manea, anti-fraud expert at the European Investment Bank in Luxembourg since 2019. Siegfried Mureșan is passionate about tennis, and he is a great fan of the Spanish player Rafael Nadal.

Publications 
 It's Our Job Reforming Europe's Labour Markets (4 May 2015) together with Eoin Drea.

References

External links 

 European Parliament site
 Personal site
 Facebook
 Twitter 
 Instagram
 Youtube

1981 births
Living people
People from Hunedoara
Bucharest Academy of Economic Studies alumni
MEPs for Romania 2014–2019
MEPs for Romania 2019–2024
National Liberal Party (Romania) politicians
Recipients of the Order of Honour (Moldova)
Humboldt University of Berlin alumni